Shola Arikusa is a 2017 Nigerian film produced by Hissa Yusuf and directed by Okiki Afolayan.

It stars Fathia Balogun, Odunlade Adekola, Femi Adebayo,  Yinka Quadri, Kazeem Bello and many others.

Synopsis 
This is movie tells the story of a woman whose entire family were massacred because of a political appointment. Shola Arikusa seeks the aid of the god of Ijamido for vengeance.

Cast 
The following actors featured in the film;

 Fathia Balogun as Shola Arikusa
 Odunlade Adekola  as Alfa Agba
 Femi Adebayo as Inspector Biyi
 Yinka Quadri as Adifala
 Kazeem Bello as Derogba
 Remi Rebecca as Inspector Biliki
 Ijagbemi Monsuru as Goriola
 Folake Ojo as Iya Shola
 Yetunde Ogunsanya as Iya Folorunsho
 Victoria Ajibola as Prices
 Jamiu Azeez as Farugu
 Raphael Niyi as Folorunsho
 Sola Popoola as Iyawo Alfa
 Queen Adesewa as Omo Alfa
 Temitope Bamidele Saint as Army
 Mr Ladi Folarin as Oba Adeoye
 Akintunde Yusuf as Eko
 Adeleke Tosin as Arugba
 Kazeem Muritala as Ekanna
 Dammy Faniyi as Irawo
 Jamiu Isiaka as M.I
 Ayo Arowosafe as Ifagbemi
 Sunday Agbaje as Jaailegbo
 Tunde Bangbode as Fokoko

References 

Nigerian drama films
Yoruba-language films
2017 films